Stephen Douglas Nadauld (born May 31, 1942) is an American academic, the former president of Dixie State University and Weber State University (WSU). Nadauld was a general authority of the Church of Jesus Christ of Latter-day Saints (LDS Church) from 1991 to 1996.

Nadauld was born in Idaho Falls, Idaho. From 1961 to 1964, he was a missionary for the LDS Church in France, where he became a fluent speaker of French.

Nadauld obtained a bachelor's degree in chemistry from Brigham Young University (BYU), an MBA from Harvard Business School, and a Ph.D. in finance from the University of California at Berkeley (UC Berkeley). Nadauld was a faculty member at the University of Utah (1970–72) and UC Berkeley (1973–76). In 1976, he became a faculty member at BYU, where he eventually became the head of the school's MBA program. In 1983, he left BYU for private sector opportunities, including a period of time as the CEO of a dairy cooperative and CFO of Bonneville Pacific Corporation. He was also president of Weber State College (now WSU) in Ogden, Utah, for five years. During his tenure, Nadauld was instrumental in Webers State's preparations to become a university. In 1991, Nadauld was awarded an honorary doctorate degree from WSU.

In 1991, Nadauld became a member of the LDS Church's Second Quorum of the Seventy, a full-time ecclesiastical appointment. For the his entire tenure as a general authority, Nadauld was a counselor to Jack H. Goaslind in the general presidency of the church's Young Men organization. He served as a general authority until 1996, when he again returned to BYU as a professor of business management. From 2003 to 2006, Nadauld took a leave of absence from BYU to serve as president of the church's Switzerland Geneva Mission. Following this service, Nadauld returned as a faculty member at BYU.

On March 22, 2010, Nadauld was inaugurated as the 17th president of Dixie State College in St. George, Utah, after serving since March 27, 2008, as its interim president.  During his presidency, the institution transitioned from a college to a university, formally being designated as such in February 2013. He retired at the end of the 2013–14 academic year.

Nadauld is the author of two books on spiritual LDS Church-related themes. He is married to Margaret Dyreng, who was the general president of the LDS Church's Young Women organization from 1997 to 2002. They are the parents of seven sons.

Publications
Stephen D. Nadauld (2001). Justified by Faith (Salt Lake City, Utah: Deseret Book) 
—— (1999). Principles of Priesthood Leadership (Salt Lake City, Utah: Bookcraft)

References

External links
Stephen D. Nadauld: Latter-day Saint official profile
BYU faculty profile

1942 births
American chief executives
American Mormon missionaries in France
Brigham Young University faculty
Brigham Young University alumni
Utah Tech University people
Counselors in the General Presidency of the Young Men (organization)
Harvard Business School alumni
American Latter Day Saint writers
Living people
Members of the Second Quorum of the Seventy (LDS Church)
Mission presidents (LDS Church)
American Mormon missionaries in Switzerland
People from Idaho Falls, Idaho
Haas School of Business alumni
University of California, Berkeley faculty
University of Utah faculty
Presidents of Weber State University
20th-century Mormon missionaries
21st-century Mormon missionaries
American general authorities (LDS Church)
American chief financial officers
Religious leaders from Idaho
Latter Day Saints from Utah
Latter Day Saints from Idaho
Latter Day Saints from California